The Bridge to Nowhere is a concrete road bridge meant to connect Gorkha Municipality and Siranchowk Rural Municipality in Gorkha District, Gandaki Province, Nepal.  It has no roads leading to it.

It is being built across the Daraudi River to provide road access to Nareshwar, Gorkha municipality-3 and Jarebar, Siranchowk rural municipality-5.  The intention is to build roads to it later, but the area required to construct roads to the bridge belongs to local farmers and no plans have been initiated to acquire and compensate the farmers.

See  also
 List of bridges in Nepal

References

 Himalayan News Service, "Tens of millions of rupees spent on bridge sans road", The Himalayan, 7 August 2022.

External links

 
Gandaki Province